Diego Luna (born 1979), is a Mexican actor, director and producer

Diego Luna may also refer to:

Diego Luna (footballer, born 2000), Venezuelan football centre-back for Deportivo La Guaira
Diego Luna (soccer, born 2003), American soccer midfielder for Real Salt Lake